In the 2001 census there were 137 villages in Pathardi tehsil of Ahmednagar district of state of Maharashtra. However the 2011 census only listed 134 villages. The list of village in Pathardi taluka:

A
 Adgaon
 Agaskhand
 Akola
 Alhanwadi
 Ambikanagar (Ambika Nagar)
 Aurangpur (Auranjpur)

B
 Badewadi
 Bhalgaon
 Bharajwadi
 Bhawarwadi
 Bhilwade
 Bhose
 Bhutetakali
 Bondarwadi
 Borsewadi

C
 Chekewadi
 Chichondi
 Chinchpur Ijade (Chinchpur Eejade)
 Chinchpur Pangul
 Chitali
 Chitalwadi
 Chumbhali

D
 Dagadwadi
 Damalwadi
 Damalwadi
 Dangewadi
 Devrai
 Dhakanwadi
 Dhakanwadi
 Dhamangaon
 Dhangarwadi
 Dharwadi
 Dhawalewadi
 Dongarwadi
 Dulechandgaon

E
 Ekanathwadi (Eknathwadi)

G
 Ghaitadakwadi
 Ghatshiras
 Ghumatwadi
 Gitewadi

H
 Hakewadi
 Hanuman Takali
 Hatra

J
 Jambhali
 Jatdeole
 Jawakhede Dumala
 Jawakhede Khalsa 
 Jawalwadi
 Jirewadi
 Jogewadi
 Joharwadi

K
 Kadgaon
 Kalas Pimpri
 Kalegaon Fakir
 Kalewadi
 Kamat Shingave
 Karadwadi
 Karanji
 Karegaon
 Karodi
 Kasalwadi
 Kasar Pimpalgaon
 Kasarwadi
 Kaudgaon
 Kelwandi
 Khandgaon
 Kharwandi
 Kherde
 Kolhar
 Kolsangavi
 Kopare
 Koradgaon
 Kuttarwadi

L
 Landakwadi
 Lohasar

M
 Madhi
 Malegaon
 Malewadi
 Malibabhulgaon
 Mandave
 Manewadi
 Manik Daundi
 Midsangavi
 Miri
 Mohari
 Mohate
 Mohoj Bk.
 Mohoj Diodhe
 Mohoj Kh.
 Munguswade

N
 Nandur-nimba-daitya (Nandur Nimbadaitya)
 Nimbodi
 Nipani Jalgaon
 Nivadunge (Nivdunge)

P
 Padali
 Pagori Pimpalgaon
 Palavewadi
 Parewadi
 Pattryacha Tanda (Patryacha Tanda)
 Pimpalgaon Tappa
 Pimpalgavhan (Pimapalgavan)
 Pirewadi
 Prabhupimpri

R
 Raghohivre
 Ranjani
 Renukaiwadi
 Rupnarwadi

S
 Saidapur
 Sakegaon
 Sangavi Bk.
 Sangavi Kh.
 Satwad
 Shankarwadi
 Shekate
 Shindewadi
 Shingave Keshav
 Shiral
 Shirapur
 Shirasathwadi
 Somthane Bk.
 Somthane Kh.
 Somthane Nalwade
 Sonoshi
 Susare

T
 Takali Manur
 Tinkhadi
 Tisgaon
 Tondoli
 Tribhuwanwadi

V
 Vaiju Babhulgaon (Viajubabhulgaon)

W
 Wadgaon (Vadgaon)
 Walunj
 Wasu

Y
 Yeli

See also
 Rahata tehsil
 Tehsils in Ahmednagar
 Villages in Akole tehsil
 Villages in Jamkhed tehsil
 Villages in Karjat tehsil
 Villages in Kopargaon tehsil
 Villages in Nagar tehsil
 Villages in Nevasa tehsil
 Villages in Parner tehsil
 Villages in Rahata taluka
 Villages in Rahuri tehsil
 Villages in Sangamner tehsil
 Villages in Shevgaon tehsil
 Villages in Shrigonda tehsil
 Villages in Shrirampur tehsil

References

 
Pathardi